Sonia Vigneault is a French-Canadian actress, based in Montreal, Quebec. She has starred in several television programs and movies, including Mogadon 7, Bouscotte and Zigrail and Providence.

References

External links
 

Canadian film actresses
Year of birth missing (living people)
Living people
Actresses from Montreal